Nakaya (written: 中谷, 仲谷 or 中矢) is a Japanese surname. Notable people with the surname include:

, Japanese racing driver
, Japanese artist
Katsuhiko Nakaya (born 1957), Brazilian sprinter
, Japanese ichthyologist
, Japanese judoka
, Japanese voice actress, singer and idol
, Japanese physicist and writer
, Japanese long-distance runner

See also
Nakaya Islands, an island group of Graham Land, Antarctica
 Nakaya Fountain Pens
 Nakatani, other Japanese surnames using the same kanji 中谷 or 仲谷.

Japanese-language surnames